Ditsong Museums is an amalgamation of eight museums in the Pretoria and Johannesburg environs in the Gauteng Province. The museums "have diverse collections covering the fields of fauna and flora, palaeontology, military history, cultural history, geology, anthropology and archaeology."

Museums 
Ditsong manages several institutions from its central headquarters in the former Native Affairs building on Church street, Pretoria.
 Ditsong National Museum of Natural History
 Ditsong National Museum of Military History
 Ditsong National Museum of Cultural History
 Pionier Museum
 Sammy Marks Museum
 Tswaing Meteorite Crater
 Kruger Museum
 Willem Prinsloo Agricultural Museum

Mandate
According to the website the "mandate of the organisation is as follows:

 Collection, conservation and safe management of national heritage collections on behalf of the South African nation.
 Carry out research and publish such information for the cultural, social and economic use locally and internationally.
 Design, implement and manage exhibitions and public programmes with a view to supporting the national educational curriculum, economic development  and other socio-economic objectives of the Government.
 Render heritage-based service to other museums (national, provincial, local and private) as well as to individuals and tertiary institutions."

References

Museums in Johannesburg
Museums in Pretoria
Military history of South Africa
Military and war museums in South Africa